Cambria is a village in Columbia County, Wisconsin, United States. The population was 767 at the 2010 census. It is part of the Madison Metropolitan Statistical Area.

History
The town was incorporated in 1866. It was first called Florence, or Langdon's Mills, later Bellville, and finally Cambria, the Latin name for Wales, probably on account of the Welsh settlers who came there in 1845.

Preceding the first Welsh colonists by about a year were two brothers, John and Samuel Langdon. In 1844, they settled on the site of the present village of Cambria, Samuel P. Langdon building a sawmill on a branch of Duck Creek, the other opening a small stock of merchandise. They surveyed and platted four blocks, and called the village Florence. But the mill dominated the landscape in those days, and the settlement around it was called Langdon's Mills.

The settlement had just begun when about fifty Welshmen, with their wives and children, came from North Wales, many from Dolwyddelan. Morris J. Rowlands, a son of one of the colonists, wrote in 1912,Early in the summer of 1845 several families from North Wales met accidentally at Liverpool, England, seeking passage as immigrants to the United States of America. On the 17th day of July they sailed from Liverpool harbor on board a sailing vessel named the Republic, and after a voyage of six weeks and two days arrived safely in New York City on the 30th of August, 1845. . . .

After arriving in New York, a number of families whose male members were quarrymen in the old country, went to the slate quarries of New York and Vermont, but the majority of them turned their faces "Westward," a word taken as their motto before leaving their native land.

The next portion of the journey from New York to Albany was made on a steamboat. From Buffalo they took passage over the lakes on board a steamboat named Wisconsin, the name possibly being the means of drawing them to that particular boat; for that state was their "promised land." After a stormy voyage on the lakes they arrived at Milwaukee, Wisconsin, on the 16th day of September, where a portion of them landed, and on the 17th at Racine, where the remainder left the boat.

On the 24th of September, having previously agreed upon them, Robert Closs, David D. Roberts, John R. Rowlands Sr., Evan Edwards 
and Jabez Lloyd left their families at the places mentioned, and were joined by E. B. Williams, William R. Williams, John O. Jones and 
John Edwards (single men). The party then started on foot in search of a suitable place on which to locate, traveling westward over the eastern part of the state, and passing through the village of Fox Lake, where a branch land office was located… They entered into Columbia, then called Portage County, about four miles (6 km) north of the present site of the village of Randolph, arriving foot-sore and weary on Saturday evening, September 27th.…

After resting themselves over Sunday … they continued their westward course until they came to a point on the Fox River near the center of Section 16, Township 13, Range 11. There they discontinued for the first time their westward course and turned south, passing over Portage Prairie.…

After crossing Duck Creek the party entered South Prairie, to which they took quite a fancy, and after traveling over the land, examining the quality of the soil, locating the timber land and investigating the source of water supply, late in the afternoon they walked up to the highest point, which was about half a mile southwest of Zion's Church in Springvale, and there sat down on the green grass deliberating over the situation and comparing notes on the different localities through which they had passed during the week. Viewing the beautiful landscape before them and stretching in splendor for miles in every direction under the variable-colored rays of the setting sun, they deliberately 
decided to make that locality their place of future abode, hoping that they were thus forming a nucleus around which their countrymen in 
the future would gather to form a Welsh colony.

After deciding on the location, they prepared to return, calling first at the Fox Lake land office to enter their claims. Then, returning to their families at Milwaukee and Racine, they immediately prepared to move onto their farms, coming over in covered emigrant wagons — "prairie schooners" — and by the middle of October they were all on their places, housed in what people nowadays would call "miserable shanties," but to them, after their wearisome journey, they were "comfortable homes." Facing the winter of 1845–46, the settlement contained in round numbers, including children, fifty-three persons, composed of nine families and seven single men.

The Dolwyddelan connection is recorded in an article published posthumously by J. Glyn Davies, a descendant of John Jones, Talysarn, whose brothers and sisters had emigrated to Cambria. In the article, he records that as a young man in 1898, he had visited Cambria to meet his kindred and found it was still a Welsh-speaking community which maintained its links with Wales.

In 1848 the Langdons, founders of the settlement from which sprung the village, raised a frame for a gristmill, but they had exhausted their means in their sawmill and store, and were unable to purchase the necessary machinery to operate it. In the spring of 1849 a Mr. Bell appeared and advanced money for that purpose, taking a mortgage upon the Langdon property as security. In consequence of nonpayment of the debt, the property passed into his hands, and the new owner surveyed and platted quite a large addition to the original site. In order to perpetuate his name he called the village Bellville.

Mr. Bell continued to operate the mill until 1851, when he disposed of all his holdings — not only in the mill but in the village site — to John Jones and Evan Edwards. But the new proprietors of the village, as well as the Welshmen who had settled there, were not pleased with the name Bellville, and by them it was changed to Cambria. But little growth was attained until the completion of the railroad through the place in 1857; and it has never had a rapid development.

Geography

Cambria is located at  (43.542645, -89.109919).

Demographics

2010 census
As of the census of 2010, there were 767 people, 301 households, and 201 families living in the village. The racial makeup of the village was 91.7% White, 0.8% African American, 0.1% Native American, 0.4% Asian, 6.4% from other races, and 0.7% from two or more races. Hispanic or Latino of any race were 12.1% of the population.

There were 301 households, of which 38.2% had children under the age of 18 living with them, 49.2% were married couples living together, 13.6% had a female householder with no husband present, 4.0% had a male householder with no wife present, and 33.2% were non-families. 27.9% of all households were made up of individuals, and 11.3% had someone living alone who was 65 years of age or older. The average household size was 2.55 and the average family size was 3.14.

The median age in the village was 35.7 years. 28.7% of residents were under the age of 18; 6.9% were between the ages of 18 and 24; 27.2% were from 25 to 44; 27.3% were from 45 to 64; and 10% were 65 years of age or older. The gender makeup of the village was 51.2% male and 48.8% female.

2000 census
As of the census of 2000, there were 792 people, 307 households, and 195 families living in the village. The population density was 752.0 people per square mile (291.2/km2). There were 339 housing units at an average density of 321.9 per square mile (124.7/km2). The racial makeup of the village was 95.71% White, 0.25% African American, 0.63% Native American, 0.13% Asian, 2.90% from other races, and 0.38% from two or more races. Hispanic or Latino of any race were 6.44% of the population.

There were 307 households, out of which 35.5% had children under the age of 18 living with them, 52.1% were married couples living together, 8.8% had a female householder with no husband present, and 36.2% were non-families. 33.2% of all households were made up of individuals, and 18.2% had someone living alone who was 65 years of age or older. The average household size was 2.58 and the average family size was 3.30.

In the village, the population was spread out, with 30.1% under the age of 18, 8.0% from 18 to 24, 27.9% from 25 to 44, 19.4% from 45 to 64, and 14.6% who were 65 years of age or older. The median age was 35 years. For every 100 females, there were 94.1 males. For every 100 females age 18 and over, there were 92.4 males.

The median income for a household in the village was $38,750, and the median income for a family was $49,750. Males had a median income of $35,313 versus $22,109 for females. The per capita income for the village was $17,070. About 4.2% of families and 6.6% of the population were below the poverty line, including 7.6% of those under age 18 and 9.0% of those age 65 or over.

Transportation
Cambria is at the end of a Wisconsin and Southern Railroad branchline from Horicon.

Notable people

 W. R. Davies, second president (1941–1959) of the University of Wisconsin–Eau Claire
 Davy Jones, Major League Baseball player for the Milwaukee Brewers/St. Louis Browns, Chicago Cubs, Detroit Tigers, Chicago White Sox and the Pittsburgh Rebels
 David R. Jones, architect
 Evan O. Jones, Wisconsin State Senator
 Owen Mays, musician
 William Owen, Wisconsin State Representative
 Samuel Owens, Wisconsin State Representative
 Edward D. Roberts, California State Treasurer (1911–1915)
 Edwin Myrwyn Rowlands, Wisconsin State Senator
 Gena Rowlands, actress
 Victor W. Voorhees, architect

References

External links
 Cambria, Wisconsin village website
 Sanborn fire insurance map: 1914

Villages in Columbia County, Wisconsin
Villages in Wisconsin
Madison, Wisconsin, metropolitan statistical area